The Korean Tiger Bullion Series Medal (Korean: 호랑이불리온) is a series of gold bullion medals issued by the Korean Minting, Security Printing & ID Card Operating Corporation (KOMSCO). The first series was introduced in June 2016. The medals are minted in the following denominations of 1/4 oz, 1/2 oz, and 1 oz of 99.99% of fine gold.

KOMSCO plan the tiger bullion series as a yearly issue, the design changes every year. Unlike other bullion coins like Perth Mint Kangaroo Bullion and Chinese Gold Panda. It has a limited annual mintage, this may raise their numismatic value over the value of gold used.

The Design - Korean Tiger 
In Korean history and culture, the tiger is regarded as a guardian that drives away evil spirit and a sacred creature that brings good luck – the symbol of courage and power.

Obverse: Features the powerful Korean tiger. 
Reverse: Depicts representation of the Korean peninsula in Hangul.

Anti-Counterfeit Technology 
In order to prevent forgery, the medal was created with the traditional hallmark and latent image technology. The image changes letters according to the tilted angles, From [AU] to [9999] purity of the fine gold.

Mintage 
The following table present the Korean Tiger series mintage by KOMSCO, Korean Mint

See also 

Korea Minting and Security Printing Corporation
Gold as an investment

References 

Gold coins
Bullion coins